The 2015 Open Sud de France was a tennis tournament played on indoor hard courts. It was the 28th edition of the Open Sud de France, and part of the ATP World Tour 250 Series of the 2015 ATP World Tour. It took place at the Arena Montpellier in Montpellier, France, from February 2 to February 8, 2015.

Points and prize money

Point distribution

Prize money 

* per team

Singles main draw entrants

Seeds 

 Rankings are as of January 19, 2015.

Other entrants 
The following players received wildcards into the singles main draw:
  Laurent Lokoli
  Vincent Millot
  Lucas Pouille

The following players received entry from the qualifying draw:
  Nikoloz Basilashvili
  Taro Daniel
  Steve Darcis
  Jürgen Zopp

Withdrawals 
Before the tournament
  Julien Benneteau → replaced by  Benoît Paire
  Andrey Golubev → replaced by  Andreas Beck
  Andrey Kuznetsov → replaced by  Alexander Kudryavtsev

Retirements
  Jerzy Janowicz (illness)
  Malek Jaziri (right elbow injury)

Doubles main draw entrants

Seeds 

 Rankings are as of January 19, 2015.

Other entrants 
The following pairs received wildcards into the doubles main draw:
  Dorian Descloix /  Gaël Monfils 
  Laurent Lokoli /  Alexander Zverev

Withdrawals
During the tournament
  Malek Jaziri (right elbow injury)

Finals

Singles 

  Richard Gasquet defeated  Jerzy Janowicz, 3–0, retired

Doubles 

  Marcus Daniell /  Artem Sitak defeated  Dominic Inglot /  Florin Mergea, 3–6, 6–4, [16–14]

References

External links 
Official website

 
O